The Miss Rhode Island competition is the pageant that selects the representative for the state of Rhode Island in the Miss America pageant.

Abby Mansolillo of Providence was crowned Miss Rhode Island 2022 on May 1st, 2022 at the McVinney Auditorium in Providence, Rhode Island. She competed for the title of Miss America 2023 at the Mohegan Sun in Uncasville, Connecticut in December 2022.

Gallery of past titleholders

Results summary
The following is a visual summary of the past results of Miss Rhode Island titleholders at the national Miss America pageants/competitions. The year in parentheses indicates the year of the national competition during which a placement and/or award was garnered, not the year attached to the contestant's state title.

Placements
 3rd runners-up: Marilyn Cocozza (1968)
 Top 10: Laurie Gray (2004)
 Top 15: Deborah Saint-Vil (2011)

Awards

Preliminary awards
 Preliminary Lifestyle and Fitness: Debra Cusick (1976), Karen Lindsay (2000), Ashley Bickford (2008)
 Preliminary Talent: Marilyn Cocozza (1968), Laurie Gray (2004), Deborah Saint-Vil (2011)

Non-finalist awards
 Non-finalist Interview: Lisa Snow (1993)
 Non-finalist Talent: Cheryl Hirst (1962), Cheryl Girr (1967), Teresa Bradley (1971), Karen Salvatore (1975), Kelly Jo Roarke (1998), Julianna Strout (2010)

Other awards
 Miss Congeniality: Ann Willis (1959)
 Miss Photogenic: Ashley Bickford (2008)
 Dr. David B. Allman Medical Scholarship: Laurie Gray (2004)
 Quality of Life Award Winners: Allison Rogers (2007)
 Quality of Life Award 2nd runners-up: Jessica Marfeo (2014)
 Quality of Life Award Finalists: Ashley Bickford (2008), Francesca Simone (2009), Alexandra Curtis (2016)
 Women in Business Scholarship Award Winners: Shruti Nagarajan (2017)

Winners

Notes

References

External links
 

Rhode Island
Women in Rhode Island
Rhode Island culture
1923 establishments in Rhode Island
Annual events in Rhode Island
Recurring events established in 1923